Schneller may refer to:

People
 Abba Hushi, né Schneller (1898-1969), Israeli politician
 Ernst Schneller (1890-1944), German school teacher, politician and concentration camp victim
 George C. Schneller (? – 2000), Anglican Orthodox bishop and metropolitan
 Johanna Schneller, Canadian film journalist and television personality
 John Benjamin Schneller (1911-1978), American football player
 Lajos Reményi-Schneller (1892-1946), Hungarian politician
 Oliver Schneller (born 1966), German composer and saxophonist
 Otniel Schneller (born 1952), Israeli politician

Other
 Schneller Orphanage, a German Protestant orphanage in Jerusalem from 1860 until World War II, afterwards known as Camp Schneller
 Schneller (crater), a lunar crater
 1782 Schneller, an asteroid
 Dein Herz schlägt schneller, a song performed by a German hip hop band Fünf Sterne Deluxe
 Marka refugee camp, Jordan, sometimes called "Schneller camp"

German-language surnames
Jewish surnames